Moncrieff Bay is a bay in the Australian state of South Australia located at the east end of the Dudley Peninsula on Kangaroo Island in the gazetted locality of Willoughby overlooking Backstairs Passage about  south-west of the state capital of Adelaide and about  south-east of the municipal seat of Kingscote.

It was named in September 1908 after A. B. Moncrieff, the Engineer in Chief of the Department of Marine & Harbors.  It was one of eleven places in South Australia so named at the time as part of an effort “to name some of the more prominent features on the coast of South Australia which had been left blank in the Admiralty and land charts…”

It consists of the section of coastline which faces east and runs in a north-south direction between the headlands of Cape St Albans in the north and Cape Willoughby in the south. It includes one inlet – Pink Bay.

The bay’s coastline is described as being “boulder beaches’ with the exception of two beaches composed of sand at its southern end. Both are unpatrolled swimming beaches which are considered by Surf Life Saving Australia to be respectively ‘least hazardous’ and ‘moderately hazardous’ while the "boulder beaches" being considered to be "extremely hazardous."

The bay’s bottom is described in 2002 by divers doing a fish population survey as consisting of “blocks (1-2 m) and boulders going to sand at 5 m depth” and there was a “rocky bottom at southern end of (the) bay 250 m each side of beach.”  Also, the following algae genera and species were considered to be the dominant alga present in parts of the bay surveyed - genus Ecklonia, genus  Cystophora represented by C.siliquosa, C.moniliformis,  and C. intermedia, genus Acrocarpia and Sargassum fallax from the family Sargassaceae.

As of late 2012, the waters adjoining its shoreline are within a habitat protection zone in the protected area known as the Encounter Marine Park.

References

Bays of South Australia
Dudley Peninsula
Backstairs Passage